"Small Worlds" is the fifth episode of the first series of the British science fiction television series Torchwood, which was originally broadcast on the digital television channel BBC Three on 12 November 2006.

The episode involves the alien hunters Torchwood investigating a group of deadly fairies who intend to turn the Cardiff child Jasmine Pierce (Lara Phillipart) into a fairy.

Filming took place in the villages of Radyr and Pentyrch in Cardiff North.

Plot
Jack is invited to a presentation on fairies held by his former lover Estelle, and brings Gwen along. Estelle shows the audience the Cottingley Fairies photographs, then compares them to photographs she had taken a couple of nights before. Jack and Estelle later discuss the photographs and the nature of fairies at her home. On the way back to the Torchwood Hub, Jack explains to Gwen that the fairies are creatures from the dawn of time and are not bound by linear time. He says that the fairies can be very dangerous. Jack instructs Toshiko to watch for strange weather patterns in the area in order to locate the fairies.

Meanwhile, a paedophile called Mark Goodson tries to abduct a young girl called Jasmine while she is walking home. He retreats after a strong wind appears and he hears ethereal voices. Still hearing the voices, Goodson stumbles through the Cardiff market, and starts to cough up rose petals. He gets himself arrested to seek the safety of a jail cell. However, he is found the next day dead by asphyxiation. Torchwood arrive and find Goodson's mouth filled with rose petals. Jack confirms that fairies, which he encountered before, murdered Goodson as part of their protection of a "Chosen One", a child that will soon become the fairies' if Torchwood cannot find her in time. Late at night, the fairies kill Estelle by drowning her with a localised rainstorm. Torchwood understand that the fairies are becoming more protective and aggressive.

The fairies cause a large gale to sweep over Jasmine's school the next day, traumatising two girls that were bullying Jasmine. Torchwood find out from Jasmine's teacher that the only one not affected by the storm was Jasmine, confirming she is the Chosen One. Meanwhile, Jasmine's mother Lynn and her boyfriend Roy are holding a party in their garden. When Jasmine goes outside she finds that Roy fenced off the garden to prevent her from going to the woods. Jasmine bites Roy, and Roy slaps her. The fairies appear and kill Roy. Jasmine and the fairies race off to the woods. Jack tries to convince the fairies not to take her away. They refuse, stating that she is their Chosen One and if she is prevented from going many more people will die. Admitting he has no other choice, and assured Jasmine will not be harmed, Jack lets Jasmine go.

Continuity
Although Jack claims that he does not sleep in "Ghost Machine", he is shown to have a waking nightmare in this episode.
A pair of 3-D glasses, originally used by the Tenth Doctor in "Doomsday", can be seen hanging on a lamp shade on Jack's desk at the start of the episode.
 This is the first episode that explores Jack's past. At one point, he was in charge of a troop of 15 men in 1909 Lahore. A letter on the Torchwood website, dated 1908, appears to suggest that this was part of a diamond mining scam during his conman days.
 Jack's philosophy of sacrificing one person to save a much larger group would later be explored in Children of Earth.

Production

Music
 The hymn "Lord of the Dance" features during the school scene.
 The songs "Better Do Better" by HARD-Fi (Jasmine helps Lynn prepare food for the party), "Born to Be a Dancer" by Kaiser Chiefs, (Kaiser Chiefs having been previously heard in the episode "Day One"; Jasmine and Lynn take food out to the party), and "Ooh La" by The Kooks (The Kooks having been previously heard in the episode  "Everything Changes"; Roy returns to the party and makes a toast to Lynn) feature.
 The music during the closing credits contains quiet samples of the fairy laughter.

Cast notes
Lara Phillipart, who plays Jasmine in this episode, appears as a member of Tommy's family in the Doctor Who episode "The Idiot's Lantern".

Outside references
 The primary school is called "Coed y Garreg", which translates as "The Stone Woods", a possible reference to the Roundstone Woods seen at the beginning of the episode.
 The discussion about Sir Arthur Conan Doyle's involvement in the Cottingley Fairies hoax is based upon real events that occurred near Bradford in West Yorkshire, England from 1917 onwards and based around two young girls who had taken photographs of what they claimed to be fairies. Doyle was apparently convinced of their veracity.  The mention of Harry Houdini's involvement, however, is not historically accurate.  While Conan Doyle did send a letter to the skeptical Houdini about the fairy "discovery", Houdini did not respond or use the event for self-promotion as suggested in the show.  The image seen on the show is very slightly altered, with Jasmine's face over one of the fairies.
Jack compares the fairies to the Mara. His noting of "Mara" as the origin of the word "nightmare" and their ability to steal the breath from their victims suggests that he is referring to the Mara of Germanic/Scandinavian mythology and not the Mara of the Doctor Who stories Snakedance and Kinda (although, the former could still have partially inspired the latter). Christopher Bailey, author of Snakedance and Kinda, was a practising Buddhist and named Doctor Who Mara after the Buddhist demon Mara.

References

External links

 "Small Worlds" episode guide entry on the BBC website
 "Small Worlds" review at CultFiction

Torchwood episodes
2006 British television episodes
Television about fairies and sprites
Child abuse in television